Belinda Jane Hutchinson  (born 4 August 1953) is an Australian businessperson, accountant and philanthropist.

Education
Hutchinson graduated from the University of Sydney with a Bachelor of Economics degree in 1976.

Career
She was a member of the board of directors of Australian companies AGL Energy and QBE Insurance. Hutchinson was appointed chancellor of the University of Sydney in 2013. In August 2015 she was made chair of Thales Australia, the local branch of a French arms manufacturer. In July 2017 the University of Sydney created a memorandum of understanding with Thales "to work closely together over the next five years to develop new technologies and capabilities". The university says that Hutchinson had no part in the memorandum of understanding.

In December 2016, the university senate reappointed Hutchinson for a second term as chancellor. In May 2020, the university senate reappointed Hutchinson for a third term as chancellor.

Honours
In 2019, Hutchinson was elected as a fellow of the Royal Society of New South Wales. She was made a Member of the Order of Australia in the 2007 Queen's Birthday Honours, and was promoted to Companion of the Order of Australia, the highest level of the Australian Honours system, in the 2020 Queen's Birthday Honours for "eminent service to business, to tertiary education and scientific research, and through philanthropic endeavours to address social disadvantage".

References

1953 births
Living people
Australian business executives
People educated at Ascham School
University of Sydney alumni
Chancellors of the University of Sydney
Fellows of the Royal Society of New South Wales
Members of the Order of Australia
Companions of the Order of Australia